Mount Balfour is a bastion-like rocky mountain,  high, which lies at the mouth of Fleming Glacier, close to the junction with the Wordie Ice Shelf on the west side of the Antarctic Peninsula. First roughly surveyed in 1936 by the British Graham Land Expedition under Rymill, and resurveyed by the Falklands Islands Dependencies Survey in 1948. It was named for Henry Balfour, President of the Royal Geographical Society from 1936 to 1938.

References

Mountains of Palmer Land